Lower Odra Valley Landscape Park (Park Krajobrazowy Dolina Dolnej Odry) is a designated Polish Landscape Park protected area, located in West Pomeranian Voivodeship of northwestern Poland.

Geography
The Landscape Park is on the eastern banks of the river Odra (Oder) which marks the Polish-German border. 

The Park lies within West Pomeranian Voivodeship, in:
 Gryfino County — Gmina Gryfino and Gmina Widuchowa
 Police County — Gmina Kołbaskowo.

The Park is included in the Lower Odra River Valley Important Bird Area. It is also a Natura 2000 EU Special Protection Area.

Lower Oder Valley International Park
The Landscape Park covers a core zone of 6.09 km² and a buffer zone of 1,14 km². Together with the Lower Oder Valley National Park on the German side, the Lower Odra Valley Landscape Park makes up the core zone of Lower Oder Valley International Park.

See also

Special Protection Areas in Poland

References

Lower Odra Valley
Parks in West Pomeranian Voivodeship
Gryfino County
Police County 
Important Bird Areas of Poland
Natura 2000 in Poland
1993 establishments in Poland
Protected areas established in 1993

de:Nationalpark Unteres Odertal
fr:Parc national de la vallée de la Basse-Oder
ka:ოდერის ქვემო ველის ეროვნული პარკი
sv:Nationalpark Unteres Odertal
tr:Aşağı Oder Vadisi Ulusal Parkı
vi:Vườn quốc gia Unteres Odertal